Xander Severina (born 12 April 2001) is a Dutch professional footballer who plays as a winger for ADO Den Haag.

Club career
A youth product of Semper Altius, Sparta Rotterdam, and Quick Den Haag, Severina signed with ADO Den Haag on 20 May 2020. Severina made his debut with ADO Den Haag in a 4–1 Eredivisie loss to FC Utrecht on 4 April 2021.

Personal life
Born in the Netherlands, Severina is of Curaçaoan descent.

References

External links
 
 Career stats & Profile - Voetbal International

2001 births
Living people
Dutch footballers
Dutch people of Curaçao descent
Association football wingers
ADO Den Haag players
Eredivisie players
Eerste Divisie players